The Forouz gas field is an Iranian natural gas field that was discovered in 2010. It began production in 2010 and produces natural gas and condensates. The total proven reserves of the Forouz gas field are around 24.5 trillion cubic feet (700×109m3) and production is slated to be around 2.45 billion cubic feet/day (70×106m3).

References

Natural gas fields in Iran